Tolkovyata is a rural locality (a village) in Vereshchaginsky District, Perm Krai, Russia.  The population was 40 as of 2010.

Geography 
Tolkovyata is located 5 km east of Vereshchagino (the district's administrative centre) by road. Boroduli is the nearest rural locality.

References 

Rural localities in Vereshchaginsky District